= Aldershot Ice Rink =

Ice rink in Hampshire, England

Coordinates: 51.2356°N 0.7485°W

Aldershot Ice Rink was an ice rink venue located in Pool Road, Aldershot, Hampshire, England. It was opened on 24 July 1987 and closed on 15 October 1991.

Developed by Gaul & Company, Aldershot's rink was built on a restricted site with limited car parking, at a cost of £1.6 million, adjacent to a housing estate. The mayor of Rushmoor Council laid the foundation stone on 28 April 1978. At that time the Aldershot Courier claimed it to be 'the biggest ice rink in Britain'.

As the ice surface was only two-thirds of the minimum required size, the national governing body (British Ice Hockey Association), ruled in the summer of 1987 that only youth ice hockey could be sanctioned. The first ice hockey match played at the rink was on 8 November 1987 when Aldershot Colts lost 13–2 to Havering (Romford) Hornets.

A change of ownership, with plans to reopen the rink in December 1991, foundered. Rushmoor Council subsequently leased the building to the Camberley Gymnastics Club.

== Ice Hockey Teams Home Venue ==
Team name	Years	League
Aldershot Colts	1987-1991	English Junior League
Aldershot Pistols	1987-1991	English Pee-Wee League
Aldershot Bullets	1989/1990	English League Division 3 South
Aldershot Bullets	1991/1992	English U21 League (withdrew after one match due to rink closure)
Aldershot Colts	1991/1992	English U12 League
