= Aldershot Bullets =

Ice hockey team in Hampshire, England

The Aldershot Bullets were an ice hockey franchise based in Aldershot, Hampshire, England. The team were members of the English League Division 3 South Division and played their home games at Aldershot Ice Rink.

== History ==
=== Single Season of Bullets (1989/1990) ===
Aldershot entered English League Division 3 South Division as it catered for teams unable to ice sides strong enough to enter import hockey and with an undersized rink. The Aldershot Ice Rink had a capacity of just 800. The team's colours were bottle green, black and white. The 16-game schedule was not completed in the South, with Aldershot playing just 11 matches, of which they only won twice and suffered 9 losses.

English League Division 3 South Division Standings

Team	Pld.	W	L	D	GF	GA	Pts
Lee Valley Whalers	15	14	1	0	130	56	28
Gosport Dreadnoughts	16	13	3	0	215	63	26
Brighton Royals	13	4	9	0	69	88	8
Aldershot Bullets	11	2	9	0	45	86	4
Basingstoke Bears	15	2	13	0	48	215	4
